Stifflip & Co. is a graphic adventure game published by Palace Software in 1987 for the ZX Spectrum, Commodore 64 and Amstrad CPC computers. The game is set in the early 20th century, between the two World Wars, and affectionately parodies the character and attitudes of the later British Empire.

Plot
From the blurb on the game box:

Gameplay
Gameplay is in the form of a graphic adventure with the player controlling four different characters: Viscount Sebastian Stifflip, Miss Palmyra Primbottom, Professor Braindeath and Colonel R. G. Bargie. The characters and their environment are presented in a comic strip format on-screen with the player controlling them via a mixture of icons and point-and-click options (albeit controlled by a keyboard and joystick rather than a mouse).

The four different characters all have different skills and so only certain characters can solve certain puzzles. For example, anything requiring scientific knowledge requires Professor Braindeath to deal with it.

External links

Review of the Spectrum version from Your Sinclair magazine.

1987 video games
Amstrad CPC games
Adventure games
Commodore 64 games
Europe-exclusive video games
ZX Spectrum games
Video games scored by Richard Joseph
Video games developed in the United Kingdom
Single-player video games
Video games set in the 20th century
Parody video games
Palace Software games